This is a list of notable individuals born in Australia of Lebanese ancestry or people of Lebanese and Australian dual nationality who live or lived in Australia.

Athletes
 Matthew Abood – Olympic freestyle swimmer
 Paul Akkary - former professional rugby league footballer for the Newtown Jets
 Max Basheer – former administrator with the South Australian National Football League
 Michael Cheika – rugby player and Wallabies coach.
 Alex Chidiac – professional women's football player currently playing for Melbourne City and the Matildas
 Billy Dib – boxer
 Yahya El Hindi – professional football (soccer) player
 Hazem El Masri – former professional rugby league footballer
 Nathan Elasi – professional football (soccer) player 
 Benny Elias – former professional rugby league footballer for the Balmain Tigers 
 Bianca Elmir – female boxing champion 
 Ahmad Elrich – Australian former international football (soccer) player
 Ali Elrich – boxer
 Tarek Elrich – internationalfootball (soccer) player
 Buddy Farah – former international football (soccer) player
 Robbie Farah – captain of the Wests Tigers, Australian Rugby League
 Mil Hanna – Australian Rules footballer with Carlton
 Bachar Houli – professional Australian rules footballer 
 Safwan Khalil – Olympic taekwondo champion 
 Julian Khazzouh – professional basketball player
 Michael Lichaa – professional rugby league player for the Canterbury Bulldogs 
 Tim Mannah – professional rugby league player for the Parramatta Eels
 Josh Mansour - professional rugby league player for the Penrith Panthers
 Mitchell Moses – professional rugby league player for the Parramatta Eels
 Andrew Nabbout – international football (soccer) player
 Roger Rasheed – former tennis player
 Joe Reaiche - former professional rugby league footballer for the Sydney Roosters
 Michael Reda – former international football (soccer) player
 Reece Robinson – professional rugby league player for the Parramatta Eels 
 Travis Robinson – professional rugby league player for the Melbourne Storm
 Abbas Saad – Australian former international football (soccer) player
 Mohamed Sabra former international football (soccer) player
 Eddie Scarf – first Australian to win an Olympic medal in wrestling
 Nicholas Shehadie – former Captain of the Wallabies Australian Rugby Union
 Robert Younis – professional football (soccer) player

Beauty pageant contestants
 Sabrina Houssami – Miss World Australia 2006, Miss World Asia Pacific 2006
 Jessica Kahawaty

Businesspeople
 Joseph Assaf – multicultural businessman
 Ahmed Fahour – Managing Director and CEO of Australia Post
 Jacques Nasser – ex-CEO of Ford Motors
 John Symond – businessman

Entertainment personalities
 Tyler De Nawi – actor
 Firass Dirani – actor
 Etcetera Etcetera - drag queen
 Faydee – singer
 Jan Fran - TV personality and journalist
 Joe Hasham – actor 
 Tamara Jaber – singer
 Paul Khoury – TV personality and voice talent 
 Paul Nakad – actor, hip hop artist
 Daniella Rahme – TV presenter, actress and model
 Daniel Sahyounie – comedian, part of YouTube comedy group The Janoskians
 Natalie Saleeba – actress 
 Rob Shehadie – actor and comedian, co-creator of Here Come the Habibs
 Dean Vegas - singer and Elvis tribute artist 
 James Yammouni – comedian, part of YouTube comedy group The Janoskians
 Petra Yared – actor
 Doris Younane – actress
 Lincoln Younes - actor

Fashion designers 
 Steven Khalil - International Designer
 Joseph Saba

Poets and writers
 Mireille Astore – artist and writer
 Nada Awar Jarrar – author
 David Malouf – poet and author
 Wadih Sa'adeh – poet

Politicians
 John Ajaka – Member of the New South Wales Legislative Council
 Alexander Alam – political leader, member of the Australian Labor Party
 Marie Bashir – Governor of New South Wales
 Karl Bitar -was the 9th National Secretary of the Australian Labor Party and former General Secretary of NSW Labor
 Steve Bracks – former Premier of Victoria
 Jihad Dib – Member of the New South Wales Legislative Assembly for Lakemba
 Nazih Elasmar – former Mayor of Darebin and member of the Victorian Legislative Council for Northern Metropolitan Region
 George Joseph – former Lord Mayor of Adelaide
 Marlene Kairouz – former Mayor of Darebin and member of the Victorian Legislative Assembly for the electoral district of Kororoit
 Bob Katter, Sr. – politician 
 Bob Katter – member of the Australian House of Representatives for the Division of Kennedy
 Salim Mehajer - former Auburn deputy mayor and convicted criminal
 Daryl Melham – member of Australian House of Representatives  
 Cesar Melhem – Victorian State Secretary of Australian Workers Union 
 Eddie Obeid – former New South Wales government minister and convicted criminal
 Barbara Perry – member for Auburn for fourteen years
 Sir Nicholas Shehadie – former Lord Mayor of Sydney
 Michael Sukkar - Federal Member for Deakin, Assistant Minister to the Treasurer
 Jackie Trad – Deputy Premier of Queensland

See also
Lebanese Australians
List of Lebanese people
List of Lebanese people (Diaspora)

References

Australia
Lebanese
 
Lebanese
Asian-Australian culture